Villa Santa Lucia degli Abruzzi is a little comune and town in the province of L'Aquila in the Abruzzo region of Italy. It is located in the Gran Sasso e Monti della Laga National Park.

Twin town
 Port Colborne, Canada

References

External links
Villa Pro-loco association site
Carrufo Pro-Loco association site

Gallery

Cities and towns in Abruzzo